Subang may refer to:

Indonesia
Subang, Kuningan, a town and district in Kuningan Regency, West Java
Subang Regency, a regency of West Java
Subang, Subang, a town and district in Subang Regency, West Java

Malaysia
Subang (federal constituency), represented in the Dewan Rakyat
Subang (state constituency), formerly represented in the Selangor State Legislative Assembly (1986–95)
Subang, Selangor, an affluent residential town in Selangor state
Subang Jaya, an affluent suburban city in Selangor state near Kuala Lumpur
Subang Jaya (state constituency), represented in the Selangor State Legislative Assembly (1995–present)
Sultan Abdul Aziz Shah Airport, formerly Subang International Airport